The 2016–17 season is Brighton & Hove Albion's 115th year in existence and sixth consecutive season in the Championship. Along with competing in the Championship, the club participated in the FA Cup and League Cup.

Brighton were promoted to the Premier League following their 2–1 home win against Wigan Athletic on 17 April 2017, with fellow promotion chasers Huddersfield Town failing to match Brighton's result in their fixture against Derby County.

The season covers the period from 1 July 2016 to 30 June 2017.

Squad

First-Team squad

Out on loan

Transfers

Transfers in

Transfers out

Loans in

Loans out

Pre-season

Friendlies

Competitions

Championship

League table

Results round by round

Matches

Brighton's fixture list for the 2016/17 Championship season was revealed on 22 June 2016.

FA Cup

EFL Cup

Statistics

Appearances and goals

 

|}

References

Brighton and Hove Albion
Brighton & Hove Albion F.C. seasons